Barbara Weiler (born 17 September 1946 in Düsseldorf) is a German politician who served as a Member of the European Parliament from 1994 until 2014. She is a member of the Social Democratic Party of Germany, part of the Socialist Group.

Weiler joined the SPD in 1970.

During her term in office, Weiler served on the European Parliament's Committee on Internal Market and Consumer Protection. In this capacity, she was the Parliament's rapporteur on the Late Payment Directive (2010-2011) and the Radio Equipment Directive (2013-2014).

In addition to her committee assignments, Weiler was a substitute for the Committee on Employment and Social Affairs, a member of the Delegation for relations with the countries of Southeast Asia and the Association of Southeast Asian Nations (ASEAN) and a substitute for the Delegation for relations with Japan. She was also part of a monitoring mission during the Ukrainian presidential election in 2014.

Education
 1963: School-leaving certificate
 Studied languages in the UK 1965-1967

Career
 1963-1965: Night school
 1965-1985: Office worker (clerk, head secretary, company secretary) in industry
 SPD organiser, Fulda District (1985-1987);
 1971-1975: Councillor in Willich, Viersen District
 1975-1985: Willich town councillor
 1987-1994: Member of the Bundestag
 1994-2014: Member of the European Parliament

References

External links
 
 
 

1946 births
Living people
Social Democratic Party of Germany MEPs
MEPs for Germany 1994–1999
MEPs for Germany 2004–2009
MEPs for Germany 2009–2014
20th-century women MEPs for Germany
21st-century women MEPs for Germany